Albert Clifford Williams, BEM (28 June 1905 – 1987) was a Welsh Labour Party politician and miner. He went to a primary school in Blaina, Monmouthshire but started work in the mines at the age of 14. Williams became a National Union of Mineworkers official in 1934. In 1952 he became a Justice of the Peace and he was a member of hospital boards for thirty years. He was also Chairman of Usk River Board for ten years.

Williams was awarded the British Empire Medal in 1957. A Monmouthshire County Councillor, he became a County Alderman in 1964 and served until 1974 when Aldermen were abolished. In April 1965 he was elected as Member of Parliament (MP) for the safe Labour seat of Abertillery in a by-election after the death of sitting MP Llywelyn Williams.  He was re-elected to the House of Commons at the 1966 general election but stood down in 1970.

After the end of his Parliamentary career, Williams served on the Sports Council for Wales (now Sport Wales) from 1972 to 1975. He also became a member of the Welsh National Water Development Authority.

References

 Who's Who of British MPs, Vol. IV, Harvester Press, 1981.

Welsh Labour Party MPs
Welsh miners
Welsh trade unionists
Councillors in Wales
National Union of Mineworkers-sponsored MPs
UK MPs 1964–1966
UK MPs 1966–1970
Recipients of the British Empire Medal
1905 births
1987 deaths